The Minister for Internal Trade is a member of the Cabinet of Canada.  The minister can be appointed under the Agreement on Internal Trade Implementation Act of 1996; however, it was not used until 2005 and by default the Minister of Industry was responsible for the administration of the act.

To date its only minister was Mauril Bélanger who took on the role on May 17, 2005, and held it for the remainder of the 27th Ministry, until February 6, 2006.

Ministers
Key:

See also
Canadian Agreement on Internal Trade
European Commissioner for Internal Market and Services
Directorate-General for Internal Market and Services (European Commission)

Internal Trade
Canada, Internal